Erick Cathriel Cabaco Almada (born 19 April 1995) is a Uruguayan footballer who plays as a central defender for Spanish club Granada CF, on loan from Getafe CF.

Club career
Cabaco is a youth exponent from Rentistas. He made his league debut on 6 April 2014. He joined Nacional in January 2016. For the 2016–17 season, he was loaned to AS Nancy who were given an option to sign him permanently.

On 1 September 2017, Cabaco was loaned to La Liga club Levante UD, for one year. On 16 May 2018, Levante triggered the buyout clause included in his loan contract for a reported €2 million.

On 31 January 2020, Cabaco signed a four-and-a-half-year contract with fellow Spanish top tier side Getafe CF. On 26 July 2022, he was joined Granada CF on a one-year loan deal, with the club in the Segunda División.

Career statistics

Club

References

External links

Living people
1995 births
Footballers from Montevideo
Uruguayan footballers
Association football central defenders
Uruguayan Primera División players
C.A. Rentistas players
Club Nacional de Football players
Ligue 1 players
Championnat National 2 players
AS Nancy Lorraine players
La Liga players
Segunda División players
Levante UD footballers
Getafe CF footballers
Granada CF footballers
Uruguayan expatriate footballers
Expatriate footballers in France
Uruguayan expatriate sportspeople in France
Expatriate footballers in Spain
Uruguayan expatriate sportspeople in Spain
Uruguay under-20 international footballers
Uruguay youth international footballers
Medalists at the 2015 Pan American Games
Pan American Games gold medalists for Uruguay
Footballers at the 2015 Pan American Games
Pan American Games medalists in football